The Private Eye Project is a research based educational program created by Kerry Ruef in 1988. Founded in both inquiry-based learning and active learning approaches, it is designed to accelerate student learning by the development of critical thinking skills, creativity, literacy, and scientific literacy. Some of the main themes are "close observation", "thinking by analogy", "hands-on investigation", "changing scale", and "theorizing". One of the main tools used in the program for enhancing close observation is a loupe. The first three and one half years were grant-funded by the Discuren Charitable Foundation and piloted in the Seattle Public Schools.

As of October 2010, The Private Eye Project has been used by thousands of teachers and over 3 million students. The Private Eye Project is both a curriculum and staff development program; its teacher-training component is also distributed via university school of education programs. And, it has been recognized positively by many university department directors, professors, and professional scientists, as well as numerous teachers and administrators; Fritjof Capra says the pattern-recognition skills embedded in The Private Eye are central to learning systems thinking; George Nelson calls it an exciting approach to ... the art of mathematical and scientific thinking which should be a part of every school. It is viewed as a powerful program for fostering ecoliteracy. It is considered an innovative program for teaching thinking. The methodology of The Private Eye Project is sometimes referenced in discussions of creativity and critical thinking.

In May 2015 The Private Eye was featured in  Microscopy Today, the journal of the Microscopy Society of America.

Research basis
The Northwest Educational Technology Consortium lists The Private Eye Project first in the list of resources for research based strategies for effective instruction in critical thinking. SEDL, formerly the Southwest Educational Development Laboratory, includes the materials of The Private Eye Project in its "Science After School" list of resources for advancing research, improving education. Education Resources Information Center lists The Private Eye Project as an educational resource.

References

External links 
 The Research Basis of the Private Eye
 The Private Eye and The Interdisciplinary Mind Video on YouTube

Education in the United States